The Garden of Archimedes (Italian: Il Giardino Di Archimede) is a museum for mathematics in Florence, Italy.  It was founded on March 26, 2004 and opened its doors to the public on April 14 of that year.  The mission of the museum is to enhance public understanding and perception of mathematics, to bring mathematics out of the shadows and into the limelight. It has been compared to the National Museum of Mathematics in New York City, the only museum in North America devoted to mathematics.

History
The Garden of Archimedes was set up in 2004 by a consortium of government and educational agencies. Current members of the consortium include: the Scuola Normale Superiore di Pisa, the University of Florence, the University of Pisa, the University of Siena, the Italian Mathematical Union, the Istituto Nazionale di Alta Matematica Francesco Severi, the Consortium for the Promotion of Culture of Research and Studies at the University of Avellino. The Consortium is based in Florence, at the Department of Mathematics "Ulisse Dini". The President of the consortium is the mathematician Enrico Giusti.

One initiative of the Garden of Archimedes is to create a history of Mathematics on CD-ROM and distribute it along with related supporting texts.

Sections

Inspired by museums such at The Exploratorium in San Francisco the Garden of Archimedes is packed with hands-on exhibits and is popular with both adults and children. The museum is divided into different sections or exhibitions, corresponding to different ways of discovering mathematics:

Beyond compasses: the geometry of curves explores the mathematics concealed in everyday objects.  Pythagoras and his theorem focuses on puzzles and play inspired by the seminal theorem. A bridge over the Mediterranean is a historical exhibition focusing on Leonardo Fibonacci and his Liber Abaci with emphasis on how mathematics from the Islamic world was reintroduced to Medieval Europe. Helping Nature: from Galileo's Mechanics to everyday life is an interactive exhibit showing how Galileo used mathematics to reveal the working of simple machines. Weapons of mass education features mathematically based games and puzzles. Other historical sections include A short history of calculus, A short history of trigonometry, Ancient mathematics through stamps, and Pink Numbers – Women and Mathematics.

References

External links
 Official website
 Playing with Mathematics at Il Giardino di Archimede  by Enrico Giusti

Mathematics museums
2004 establishments in Italy
Museums in Florence
Science museums in Italy
Buildings and structures in Florence